Mausam is a 1975 Indian Hindi-language musical romance film starring Sanjeev Kumar and Sharmila Tagore, and directed by Gulzar. It is loosely based on the 1961 novel, The Judas Tree, by A.J. Cronin. Sharmila Tagore for her acting received The Silver Lotus Award at the 23rd National Film Festival and the film itself was awarded the Second Best Feature Film. The film was nominated in eight categories at the 24th Filmfare Awards and won in two. The film also won many other accolades as well.

The film was remade in Tamil as Vasandhathil Or Naal.

Plot 
Mausam is the dramatic love story of Dr. Amarnath Gill, who falls for Chanda, the daughter of a local healer, Harihar Thapa, when visiting Darjeeling to prepare for his medical exams. Then he has to leave back to Calcutta for his final exams. He promises Chanda to return, though he never keeps his promise. Twenty-five years later, he returns as a wealthy man and searches for Chanda and her father. He learns that Harihar has died and that Chanda was married to a crippled old man. She gave birth to a daughter, became insane and died. Finding Chanda's daughter, Kajli, he sees that she closely resembles her mother and later discovers that after having been molested by her mother's brother-in-law, she ended up at a brothel. Amarnath had no choice but to buy her from the brothel and he takes Kajli home and tries to change her into a well-refined woman to make up for what he did to Chanda. Unaware that Amarnath is indirectly responsible for her mother's death, Kajli begins to fall in love with him. One day she is reminded of who she is and where she came from. Dressed back into to her old revealing clothes as a prostitute she instigates Amarnath to throw her out, she goes back to the brothel. There the madam convinced her that Amarnath loves her and she should go back to him as he loves, giving her a respectable life. Kajli goes back to him awakening him in the night where she tries to embrace him. Amarnath always seeing her as a replica of Chanda and a daughter figure. Disgusted, Amarnath  reveals to Kajli, he is the man that his mother waited all those years for and then went mad. Kajli upset runs away. The next morning Amarnath all packed up, leaving to go home, happens upon Kajli standing in the woods, with a picture of him when he was younger hidden behind her back. Kajli tells him it is his fault that her mother went mad and died and she becoming a prostitute. He tells her that yes he came back to this place to ask for her mother’s forgiveness and maybe it’s too late for Chanda but would she forgive him and be his daughter They then they drive off together, home.

Cast 
 Sharmila Tagore as Chanda Thapa/Kajli
 Sanjeev Kumar as Dr. Amarnath Gill
 Dina Pathak as Gangu Rani (Brothel madame)
 Om Shivpuri as Harihar Thapa

Production 
The film was written simultaneously along with Aandhi (1975), together by Kamleshwar, Bhushan Banmali and Gulzar, and even shot together, with Sanjeev Kumar playing the lead of an old man in the films.  Though Aandhi was released first, it ran into political controversy and portions of it had to be reshot, meanwhile Mausam was completed and released. While the song, "Meri Ishq Ke Lakhon Jhatke" was being shot with Sharmila Tagore, choreographer Saroj Khan was also in the studios for another film, that is when Gulzar requested her to teach a few moves to Tagore.

Music 
The background score for the film was composed by Salil Chowdhury and the songs were composed by Madan Mohan. The film credits dedicate this movie to Madan Mohan after his death on 14 July 1975. The songs were penned by Gulzar. Mausam is one of those two movies directed by Gulzar, the songs of which were composed by Madan Mohan. The other one is Koshish.  Gulzar stated that the song Dil Dhoondta Hai, "...one his most memorable songs..."(Scroll.in, Aug 18, 2016) that he wrote in the film.

The song Dil Dhoondta Hai, by Lata Mangeshkar and Bhupinder Singh , featured at 12th position on the Annual list of the year-end chart toppers of Binaca Geetmala for 1976.

Awards 
23rd National Film Awards:

Won

 Second Best Feature Film – Mausam
 Best Actress – Sharmila Tagore

 24th Filmfare Awards:

Won

 Best Film – Mausam
 Best Director – Gulzar

Nominated

 Best Actor – Sanjeev Kumar
 Best Actress – Sharmila Tagore
 Best Supporting Actress – Dina Pathak
 Best Music Director – Madan Mohan
 Best Lyricist – Gulzar for "Dil Dhoondta Hai"
Best Story – Kamleshwar

References

External links 
 
 Film Synopsis

1975 films
Indian drama films
Films set in Darjeeling
1970s Hindi-language films
Films featuring a Best Actress National Award-winning performance
Films based on works by A. J. Cronin
Films about prostitution in India
Hindi films remade in other languages
Urdu films remade in other languages
Films scored by Madan Mohan
Films with screenplays by Gulzar
Films directed by Gulzar
Films based on British novels
Second Best Feature Film National Film Award winners
1975 drama films
Hindi-language drama films